Jonathan Andreas Thulin (born May 7, 1988), also known as Andreas Moss since his switch to pop music, is a Dove Award Nominated, Swedish recording artist and songwriter. He is best known for his singles "Dead Come to Life", featuring Australian artist Charmaine, "Architecture" and "Compass." He has been applauded for his creative approach to music, through cinematic and theatrical recordings and music videos. His recently released music videos for "Bombs Away", featuring artist Rachael Lampa and "Dead Come to Life", were a success among critics and audiences alike.  He was a member of the chart topping band Press Play from 2010 – 2013. His solo albums "The Anatomy of a Heartflow" and "The White Room" were released on Dream Records, EMI CMG distribution. His new album "Science Fiction" was released in March, 2015 which features cameos from Royal Tailor, Group 1 Crew, Rapture Ruckus, Derek Minor, Kevin Max, Shine Bright Baby and Moriah Peters. Thulin recently featured on the top 10 single "Volcano" with New Zealand band Rapture Ruckus. In 2016, he signed a deal with Curb Records, moving into mainstream pop music. His single “Body Talk” feat. Mia More and Doeman was released on March 22, 2019, solidifying his move into electro-pop music.

History

Thulin was born in Kalmar, Sweden. His parents, Morgan and Helene Thulin, are both Swedish. He is the youngest of four children, with older brothers David and Samuel, and sister Jeanette. His parents were traveling evangelists all over Scandinavia. Thulin began singing at the age of one and recorded his first album with his family at age six.

Thulin and his family traveled full-time across America where they sang in over five hundred churches and performed with Carman and The Gaither Vocal Band. After releasing six albums with his family, Thulin began his solo career at sixteen, releasing his first album "Immovable", which was a local success in his home town at the time in Vero Beach, FL. He attended the Indian River Charter High School, school for the Visual and Performing Arts, where he graduated a year early. He went on to release another album "The Epiphany Guide" in 2008.

In January, 2010, Thulin and his wife Anna moved to Los Angeles and began attending The Dream Center. He subsequently moved to Lake Forest and began attending a Mission Viejo church, Mount of Olives, where he sang on the worship/praise team. He began touring with Press Play in November, 2010, and went on to co-write and record their successful albums "World Anthem" and "#LITO". He got signed as a solo artist to Dream Records in 2011. In April, 2011, Thulin, along with Press Play, went on tour with Rachael Lampa, Australian artist Charmaine and Ryan Stevenson.

In July 2011, Thulin travelled to Moscow, Idaho, to record his first music video "Babylon" with Neumann Films. After it released, the video created a buzz because of its cinematic approach, an approach which is very unusual in Christian music.

After releasing his first solo album "The Anatomy of a Heartflow" on Dream Records in late 2011, Thulin began touring with Charmaine on "The Love/War Tour."

In February, 2012 Thulin began work on his second effort The White Room, which featured Rachael Lampa, Charmaine and the folk band Elden. The album released on Oct 19, 2012, to major critical success.

On January 15, 2013, Thulin teamed up with Neumann Films again and released his music video for "Bombs Away", which featured and was co-written by Rachael Lampa. The YouTube video went viral and also received a tremendous amount of support from fans and critics alike.

Late summer 2013, after finishing a two-month tour in Sweden, Thulin's single "Dead Come to Life (featuring Charmaine)", became a No. 1 CHR/Hot AC radio hit. It stayed at No. 1 for 3 weeks and was also a huge hit on Air1 Radio.

In 2014, Thulin toured the U.S doing living room shows and festivals. He spent a good amount of time in Australia and New Zealand touring. Thulin finished the Air 1 Radio Positive Hits Tour with Jamie Grace, Royal Tailor, Rapture Ruckus, Moriah Peters and OBB in September 2014.

In 2015, Thulin started off his year Touring in New Zealand and Australia.

Personal life

Thulin attended North Central University for a year in 2005 before he dropped out to pursue a music career full-time. He is married and lives in Nashville, Tennessee.

Discography

Music videos
2011: "Babylon"
2013: "Bombs Away (featuring Rachael Lampa)"
2013: "Dead Come to Life (featuring Charmaine)"
2015: "Volcano" (Rapture Ruckus feature)"

References

External links
 Official website 
 EMI (Oct, 2012) EMI/CMG Distribution. Retrieved Oct 22, 2012
 Andre, Joshua (Oct, 2012) christianmusiczine. Retrieved Oct 22, 2012
 Andre, Jonathan (Nov, 2012) IndieVisionMusic. Retrieved Nov 5, 2012 
Jesus Freak Hideout (Oct, 2012) JesusFreakHideout. Retrieved Oct 9, 2012
 New Release Tuesday (Oct, 2012) NewReleaseTuesday. Retrieved Oct 14, 2012
 Billboard (Oct, 2011) Billboard. Retrieved Oct 1, 2011
 McNeese, Kevin (Oct, 2011) NewReleaseTuesday. Retrieved Oct 25, 2011

1988 births
American child singers
Christian music songwriters
Living people
American performers of Christian music
People from Kalmar
North Central University alumni
21st-century American singers
21st-century American male singers